Gratus, possibly named Gaius Vettius Gratus (fl. 3rd century), was a Roman senator who was appointed consul in AD 280. Gratus was probably the son of Vettius Gratus who was consul in AD 250. Gratus himself was appointed consul posterior alongside Lucius Valerius Messalla in AD 280.

Sources
 Martindale, J. R.; Jones, A. H. M, The Prosopography of the Later Roman Empire, Vol. I AD 260–395, Cambridge University Press (1971)
 Mennen, Inge, Power and Status in the Roman Empire, AD 193-284 (2011)

References

3rd-century Romans
Imperial Roman consuls
Late Roman Empire political office-holders
Vettii
Year of birth unknown
Year of death unknown